The 1959 U.S. National Championships (now known as the US Open) was a tennis tournament that took place on outdoor grass courts at two locations in the United States. The men's and women's singles as well as the mixed doubles were played from September 4 through September 13 at the West Side Tennis Club, Forest Hills in New York City, while the men's and women's doubles were held at the Longwood Cricket Club in Chestnut Hill, Massachusetts from August 16 though August 23, 1959. It was the 79th staging of the U.S. National Championships, and the fourth Grand Slam tennis event of the year. Neale Fraser and Maria Bueno won the singles titles.

Finals

Men's singles

 Neale Fraser (AUS) defeated  Alex Olmedo (USA) 6–3, 5–7, 6–2, 6–4

Women's singles

 Maria Bueno (BRA) defeated  Christine Truman (UK) 6–1, 6–4

Men's doubles
 Neale Fraser (AUS) /  Roy Emerson (AUS) defeated  Alex Olmedo (USA) /  Earl Buchholz (USA) 3–6, 6–3, 5–7, 6–4, 7–5

Women's doubles
 Jeanne Arth (USA) /  Darlene Hard (USA) defeated  Maria Bueno (BRA) /  Sally Moore (USA) 6–2, 6–3

Mixed doubles
 Margaret Osborne duPont (USA) /   Neale Fraser (AUS) defeated  Janet Hopps (USA) /  Bob Mark (AUS) 7–5, 13–15, 6–2

Notes

References

External links
Official US Open website

 
U.S. National Championships
U.S. National Championships (tennis) by year
U.S. National Championships (tennis)
U.S. National Championships
U.S. National Championships (tennis)
1950s in Boston
Chestnut Hill, Massachusetts
Forest Hills, Queens
1950s in Queens